The Current is a magazine of contemporary politics, culture, and Jewish affairs at Columbia University (New York, United States). Launched in December 2005, The Current publishes essays and features on a broad range of subjects including Literary & Arts, Politics, and culture. There is also a Creative section in every issue.

The Current  has conducted interviews with Muhammad Yunus, Stanley Fish, Myron Kolatch, Seyla Benhabib, Judith Butler, and others.  Its editorials have addressed issues such as university speech codes, controversial campus speakers, corporate divestment, humanitarian activism, the Saffron Revolution in Burma, the history of the Student Struggle for Soviet Jewry, and various histories of racial and ethnic integration at Columbia University.

References

External links 
 

Political magazines published in the United States
Columbia University publications
Magazines established in 2005
Magazines published in New York City
Biannual magazines published in the United States